The counties of Croatia are the first-level administrative subdivisions of the Republic of Croatia. Since they were re-established in 1992, Croatia has been divided into 20 counties and the capital city of Zagreb, which has the authority and legal status of both a county and a city (separate from the surrounding Zagreb County). As of 2015, the counties are subdivided into 128 cities and 428 (mostly rural) municipalities. The divisions have changed over time since the medieval Croatian state. They reflected territorial losses and expansions; changes in the political status of Dalmatia, Dubrovnik and Istria; and political circumstances, including the personal union and subsequent development of relations between the Kingdom of Croatia-Slavonia and the Kingdom of Hungary.

Government
County assembly is a representative and deliberative body in each county. Assembly members are elected for a four-year term by popular vote (proportional system  with closed lists and d'Hondt method) in local elections.

The executive branch of each county's government is headed by a county prefect, except that a mayor heads the city of Zagreb's executive branch. Croatia's county prefects (with two deputy prefects), mayor of Zagreb (with two deputy mayors) are elected for a four-year term by a majority of votes cast within applicable local government units, with a runoff election if no candidate achieves a majority in the first round of voting (majoritarian vote, two-round system). County prefects (with deputy prefects and mayor of Zagreb with his/her deputies) can be recalled by a referendum. County administrative bodies are administrative departments and services which are established for the performance of works in the self-governing domain of the county, as well as for the performance of works of state administration transferred to the county. Administrative departments and services are managed by heads (principals) nominated by the county prefect based on a public competition.

Funding and tasks
The counties are funded by the central government, as well as by revenue generated by county-owned businesses, county taxes and county fees. The county taxes include a five percent inheritance and gift tax, a motor vehicle tax, a vessel tax and an arcade game machine tax. The counties are tasked with performing general public administration services, primary and secondary education, government funded healthcare, social welfare, administration pertaining to agriculture, forestry, hunting, fisheries, mining, industry and construction, and other services to the economy at the county level, as well as road transport infrastructure management and issuing of building and location permits and other documents concerning construction in the county area excluding the area of the big city and the county seat city; the central government and local (city and municipal) governments may also perform each of those tasks at their respective levels according to the law. The Croatian County Association was established in 2003 as a framework for inter-county cooperation.

County spending accounts for 15 percent of the total local-government spending in Croatia. The balance is spent by cities and municipalities. Approximately one half of the total spent by the counties is channeled into their primary fields of competence – secondary and vocational education, and financing of maintenance and running costs of healthcare and social welfare institutions. There are instances where individual counties also provide services otherwise delegated to lower-level self-government, such as primary education and spatial planning in cases where those units could not set up those services. The counties are criticised for inefficient spending. The criticism primarily stems from the fact that the counties receive the bulk of the funds needed for specific purposes from the central government budget and thransfer them on. This contributes to the sense of absence of responsibility of the counties for the funds. In turn, that leads to very little or no incentive for improvements to spending efficiency or better collection of the county-level taxes. After year 2000, all those considerations have contributed to an ongoing debate in Croatia on the need of consolidation or abolition of the counties in political forums. Opinions on the matter differ considerably. They range from improving efficiency while retaining the existing counties, to consolidation to obtain nine counties, and abolition of the counties in favour of establishment of an administrative division of Croatia in five regions and potentially sub-regions.

History

Middle Ages
 
Medieval Croatia under the House of Trpimirović was territorially organised for purposes of administration into areas named župa. Each župa was governed either by the king directly or his representative for the territory. The title given to such representatives was župan. Gradually, the term župa was replaced in practice with županija – meaning "the territory governed by a župan. Since the 12th century, the counties have also been referred to by the Latin term comitatus. Since the 20th century, English-language sources use the term county to refer to županija.

The number of counties, their extent and authority have varied significantly, reflecting: changes in the relative levels of power wielded by kings and nobility; territorial changes in the course of the Croatian–Ottoman Wars; and societal and political changes through several centuries. Sources disagree on the number of counties in the medieval Croatian state. The situation is further complicated by existence of nobility-owned lands enjoying special statuses. Historians Ivan Beuc and Josip Vrbošić note that the following eleven counties are normally listed as the oldest known:

 Livno (encompassing the Livanjsko polje, with its seat in the Livno Fortress)
 Cetina (centered on the Cetina river, with its seat in Stolac)
 Imotski (south of Livno County and north of the Biokovo Mountain, seat in Imotski Fortress)
 Pliva (around the Pliva and Vrbas rivers, with seat in Sokograd)
 Pset or Pesenta (between the Una and Unac in the West, and Sana in the East, with seat in the Pset Fortress, now thought to have been in the area of present-day town of Petrovac)
 Primorje or Klis (along the Adriatic's coast between Šibenik and Omiš, with its seat in the Klis Fortress)
  (to the west of Primorje County, with the seat in the Bribir Fortress)
 Nona (around Nin as the seat of the county, and Zadar)
 Knin (with its seat in the Knin Fortress)
 Sidraga (in the area between Bribir County and Zadar, likely with seat in Biograd)
 Nina, later renamed Luka (between Knin, Nona, Sidraga and Bribir counties)

In addition to the above, other sources like historian Neven Budak list further three 10th century counties located to the northwest of the territory encompassed by the eleven counties centered around Gacka, Krbava and Lika – and named after those toponyms. There are indications that there were further contemporary counties in Lower Pannonia north of Gvozd Mountain (referred to as the Pannonian Croatia in some sources) in the same period. However, their existence is poorly documented. The prevailing opinion in Croatian historiography is that the Pannonian counties were directly subject to the ruler of the Croatian state, while the counties in the south were largely hereditary, controlled by nobility. In the area between the Kvarner Gulf of the Adriatic Sea, the Mala Kapela mountain, and the rivers of Kupa and Korana, there was the Modruš County in existence in the late 11th century.

The earliest recorded counties in the area between Sava and Drava rivers date back to the 12th century. Those counties are identified as the Zagreb, Varaždin, Virovitica, and  counties – with the Križevci County reported as the largest of them all. At the same time, Vrbas, Sana and Dubica counties were established to the south of the Sava River (in areas around Vrbas, Sana and the  near present-day Dubica respectively) as territories administered by royal appointees on behalf of the king. Another county established south of Sava in the same period was the Glaž County. Just as the Vrbas, Sana, and Dubica counties, sources locate the Glaž County to the northwestern Bosnia, but disagree on its location, placing it around the Ukrina river or, like historian Pál Engel, equating its seat  with the city of Banja Luka. Engel further noted that Tvrtko I of Bosnia may have surrendered the seat of the county to Hungarian rule by a treaty of 1357. Under the treaty, a part of Hum lands was ceded as dowry of Elizabeth of Bosnia. In the 13th century, the Požega and Vuka counties were established in the area of the modern-day Slavonia to the east of Virovitica and Križevci counties. The Požega, Vuka, Virovitica and Križevci counties were also referred to as the south-Hungarian counties.

In the 13th and 14th century, the Croatian nobility grew stronger and the counties defined by the king were reduced to a formal framework, while military and financial power was wielded by the nobility and especially the king. Other forms of administration that overlapped with county administration in this period included the Roman Catholic Church and the free royal cities, and separately the cities of Dalmatia. In such circumstances, the nobility had little incentive to perform county duties and often appointed deputies to preside over county court proceedings hearing matters of little importance once every two weeks – as all major issues were normally delegated by royal exemptions to be ruled upon on a case-by-case basis. This further diminished significance of the counties. Modruš County ceased to exist as an administrative unit as it was broken up into multiple feudal estates. Vuka, Požega and Virovitica counties were lost to the Ottoman conquest. The Vuka County became defunct in the early 16th century, Požega was conquered in 1537, and Virovitica in 1552. The Vrbas, Sana and Dubica counties also existed until the Ottoman conquest, while Glaž was last mentioned in preserved historical records in 1469.

Habsburg era
At the time of 1527 election in Cetin and the start of rule of the House of Habsburg, only three counties remained due to territorial losses to the Ottoman Empire – Zagreb, Varaždin, and Križevci counties. The gradual decline of importance of the counties, already present before the Habsburg era, continued as the Ottoman threat increased. Following the Ottoman defeat in the Great Turkish War and the subsequent 1699 Treaty of Karlowitz, as well as the Ottoman defeat in the 1716–1718 Austro-Turkish War, the territories organised in counties were expanded in 1745. The territorial expansion was accompanied by an expansion of county prerogatives: The head of the county – supremus comes – was authorised to govern in a range administrative, judicial and military affairs in the name of the king. Males of legal age residing in the county whose family originates from the county were eligible to be appointed the supremus comes. His duties were discharged through two deputies for judiciary and administration respectively, judges, as well as other professionals such as lawyers, physicians, engineers, tax collectors, etc. This expansion saw establishment of the Virovitica, Požega, and Syrmia counties. In 1778, the Severin County was established south of Zagreb, extending to the Adriatic Sea. In 1786, the Severin County was abolished. Its coastal areas extending from Fiume (modern-day Rijeka) to Senj to form the Hungarian Littoral, while the remainder was added to the Zagreb County.

In the 1850s, during the period of Bach's absolutism that followed the revolutions in the Austrian Empire Križevci and Syrmia counties were abolished and their territories added to neighbouring counties and to the Serbian Vojvodina respectively. At the same time, the Rijeka County was established in the territories previously included in the Hungarian Littoral – bringing the total number of counties to five. Virtually all these changes were reversed by the 1868 Croatian–Hungarian Settlement. However, the Hungarian Littoral was abolished and the legal Corups separatum was carved out of Fiume and its immediate surroundings to be ruled directly by Hungary, while the remainder of the Rijeka County (also referred to as the Croatian Littoral) was a part of the Kingdom of Croatia-Slavonia – itself a product of merger of Croatia and Slavonia, consisting of seven counties after the settlement.

In 1871, the Varaždin Generalate of the Croatian Military Frontier was abolished by the central authorities of the recently established Austria-Hungary and the bulk of the Bjelovar County spanning the territory previously under military control between the kingdoms of Croatia and Slavonia and including the cities of Bjelovar (as the county capital) and Ivanić Grad. A small part of the former Varaždin Generalate (the town of Kutina) was added to the Požega County. At the same time, the military part of Sisak was transferred to the civilian rule and added to the Zagreb County, while the Rijeka County received demilitarised Senj.

Abolition of the Military Frontier
In 1873, the remainder of the Croatian and Slavonian Military Frontiers was demilitarised and transferred to the civil authority. Ban Ivan Mažuranić organised the thus acquired territory by establishing six districts. Area of responsibility of each of the three Slavonian Military Frontier regiments was made a district. Elsewhere, two regimental areas of responsibility were combined to form a new district each. All the districts were named after the town hosting the regimental headquarters, except the district formed in First and the Second Ban's regiments' areas of responsibility which became the Ban's District (Banski okrug, also referred to as Banovina). Territories of the existing eight counties were reorganised internally in 1875. Districts were abolished as their subdivisions and each county was divided into two to four sub-counties (podžupanija). There were also some changes to the borders of the counties. The most significant was transfer of a portion of the Bjelovar County to the Križevci County.

In 1886, new legislation on the territories of the counties. Rijeka, Bjelovar, and Križevci counties were abolished, but the Lika-Krbava, Bjelovar-Križevci, and Modruš-Rijeka counties were established. Five of the eight counties kept their existing names, but most of them were expanded to encompass (together with the newly established counties) the former districts previously established in place of the Military Frontier. The sub-counties were abolished, and subdivisions of the counties into districts and administrative municipalities was introduced. This arrangement remained in effect until the Croatian counties were abolished in 1922, while some minor adjustments of county boundaries happened in 1913. Through 1886 reform, the counties were set up as self-governmental units in contrast to earlier county incarnations since the Middle Ages. Each had an assembly with the wealthiest taxpayers comprising half the assembly members and elected members comprising the remaining half. One assembly member was meant to represent 2000 county residents. The assemblies appointed administrative committees as their executive bodies The supremus comes was appointed by the king and county officials by the Ban. Administration of each county had six members elected by the county assembly, while the remaining members were county officials ex officio (supremus comes and deputies, county health supervisor etc.). Counties were divided into districts (Croatian kotari as government units similar to Austrian Bezirke), while municipalities (općine) and cities (gradovi) were units of local self-government. In the 1870 reform following the Croatian–Hungarian Settlement, powers of the counties were transformed. They became less independent from the central government in determination of local government policies.

Modernity
The traditional division of Croatia into counties was abolished in 1922, when the oblasts of the Kingdom of Serbs, Croats and Slovenes were introduced; these were later replaced by the banovinas of Yugoslavia. Socialist Republic of Croatia, as a constituent part of post-World War II Yugoslavia had approximately 100 municipalities as main governmental units and local government entities. The counties were reintroduced in 1992, but with significant territorial alterations from the pre-1922 subdivisions; for instance, before 1922 Transleithanian Croatia was divided into eight counties, but the new legislation established fourteen counties in the same territory. Međimurje County was established in the eponymous region acquired through the 1920 Treaty of Trianon. The county borders have sometimes changed since their 1992 restoration (for reasons such as historical ties and requests by cities); the latest revision took place in 2006. After the end of the Croatian War of Independence and during the UNTAES process in eastern Croatia, local Serb population and representatives unsuccessfully proposed various initiatives to preserve the former rebel region as one territorial unit within Croatia, including the proposal to create a new "Serb county" in the region. Present-day counties correspond to the 2021 classification of tier three of the European Union NUTS statistical regions of Croatia.

Lists of counties

Current

Historical

See also

Administrative divisions of Croatia
 Flags of the counties of Croatia
 List of county prefects of Croatia
List of Croatian counties by Human Development Index
 History of Croatia 
 Administrative divisions of the Banovina of Croatia
 Counties of the Independent State of Croatia
 ISO 3166-2:HR

Notes

References

Sources 

 
Subdivisions of Croatia
Croatia, Counties
Croatia 1
Counties, Croatia
Croatia geography-related lists
Modern history of Croatia